The ESPY Award for Best College Athlete, Women's Sports, known before 2021 as the Best Female College Athlete ESPY Award, is an annual award honoring the achievements of a female individual from the world of collegiate sports. It was first presented as part of the ESPY Awards in 2002, following the subsumption of the Best Female College Basketball Player ESPY Award, which was presented annually between the 1993 and 2001 ceremonies, inclusive. The award trophy, designed by sculptor Lawrence Nowlan, is awarded to the sportswoman adjudged to be the best in a given calendar year of those contesting collegiate sport in the United States through the National Collegiate Athletic Association (NCAA). Since the 2004 awards, the winner has been chosen by online voting through three to five nominees selected by the ESPN Select Nominating Committee. Before that, determination of the winners was made by an panel of experts. Through the 2001 iteration of the ESPY Awards, ceremonies were conducted in February of each year to honor achievements over the previous calendar year; awards presented thereafter are conferred in July and reflect performance from the June previous.

The inaugural winner of the Best Female College Athlete ESPY Award at the 2002 awards was University of Connecticut (UConn) Huskies basketball player Sue Bird. During her collegiate career, Bird won two NCAA championships, and was awarded a further eight accolades for her achievements. She became the first of two basketball players to be nominated for, and hence to win, the Best Female College Athlete ESPY Award. The 2003 winner of the award was another UConn player, Diana Taurasi. Taurasi won the accolade again the following year, and is one of three women, all UConn basketball players, to have received the Best Female College Athlete ESPY Award more than once: the most any one woman has won is Maya Moore, who earned three consecutive awards between the 2009 and 2011 ceremonies. Basketball players dominate the winners list, with 12 awards, while softball competitors have won five times, and just one swimmer (the University of California, Berkeley Golden Bears' Missy Franklin at the 2015 awards) has been recognized in the accolade's history. The most recent winner of the award, and second under its current name, is Oklahoma softball player Jocelyn Alo.

The accolade was combined with the Best Male College Athlete ESPY Award to create the Best College Athlete ESPY Award which was presented for the first time at the 2018 ceremony. Beginning in 2021, the awards were again separated into men's and women's versions using the current naming scheme.

Winners and nominees

Statistics

See also

 List of sports awards honoring women
Best Male College Athlete ESPY Award
Sporting News College Athlete of the Year
National Collegiate Athletic Association awards
ACC Athlete of the Year Award
All-America
NCAA Woman of the Year Award

Notes and references

Notes

References

External links
 

ESPY Awards
College sports trophies and awards in the United States
Women's sports in the United States
Sports awards honoring women
Awards established in 2002
2002 establishments in the United States